Bernardino Soto Estigarribia (born 20 May 1952 in Coronel Oviedo) is a Paraguayan army general and politician.

Biography
Soto entered the military academy in 1972. He followed a long military career which he culminated as General (rank he attained in 2007). Among other positions, he was an instructor at the School of the Americas.

2013 to 2015 he was Defence Minister of Paraguay in the cabinet of President Horacio Cartes. Since 2018 he is once again Defence Minister of Paraguay.

References

1952 births
Paraguayan people of Basque descent
People from Coronel Oviedo
Paraguayan military personnel
Defence ministers of Paraguay
Living people